James Clerk may refer to:

Sir James Clerk, 3rd Baronet (died 1782), of the Clerk Baronets
Sir James Clerk, 7th Baronet, of the Clerk Baronets

See also
Sir James Clerke (c. 1584–?), English lawyer and politician

Clerk (disambiguation)
James Clark (disambiguation)
James Clarke (disambiguation)